Thaumasesthes penicillus is a species of beetle in the family Cerambycidae, and the only species in the genus Thaumasesthes. It was described by Fairmaire in 1894.

References

Pteropliini
Beetles described in 1894